Yasynets is a village in western Ukraine, in the Sarny Raion of Rivne Oblast, but was formerly administered within Dubrovytsia Raion. Its population is 544 people, it was founded 1610, and has an area of 0.69 km².

Sources 
 

Villages in Sarny Raion